This is a list of Native Americans awarded the nation's highest military decoration — the Medal of Honor. The Medal of Honor is bestowed "for conspicuous gallantry and intrepidity at the risk of life, above and beyond the call of duty, in actual combat against an armed enemy force."  The medal is awarded by the President of the United States on behalf of the Congress.

Of the 3,469 Medals of Honor awarded as of 2010, 29 have been awarded to Native Americans.

The Medal of Honor was created during the American Civil War and is the highest military decoration presented by the United States government to a member of its armed forces. The recipient must have distinguished themselves at the risk of their own life above and beyond the call of duty in action against an enemy of the United States. Due to the nature of this medal, it is commonly presented posthumously.

List of recipients

References

Awards honoring indigenous people
Native Americans
Medal of Honor recipients
American Medal of Honor